Pasiphila plinthina is a moth in the family Geometridae. It is endemic to New Zealand and is found in both the North, South and Stewart Islands. It is on the wing mainly from June until September with occasional observations up to December, and is attracted to light. This species is similar in appearance to P. sandycias but can be distinguished from it as P. plinthina has palpi that are longer and has more blurred forewing markings.

Taxonomy 
This species was first described by Edward Meyrick in 1888. The male holotype specimen was collected by A. Purdie in July in Wellington and it is held at the Natural History Museum, London. George Hudson in his 1898 book New Zealand moths and butterflies (Macro-lepidoptera) placed this species in the Chloroclystis genus. Hudson confirmed this placement in his 1928 book The butterflies and moths of New Zealand. However, in 1988 J. S. Dugdale, in his catalogue of New Zealand Lepidoptera, returned this species to the Pasiphila genus. In 2012 this placement was confirmed in the New Zealand Inventory of Biodiversity.

Description 

Meyrick described the species as follows:
This species is similar in appearance to P. sandycias with which it has been confused. It can be distinguished from this species as its palpi are longer and has more blurred forewing markings.

Distribution 
This species is endemic to New Zealand. It is found in the North, South Islands and Stewart Islands.

Behaviour 
P. plinthina is on the wing mainly from June until September with occasional observations up to December, and as such it is regarded as a winter specialist. P. plinthina are attracted to light. Hudson explained that this species could sometimes be found resting on tree trunks but that it was more often collected when dislodged from foliage.

References

Moths described in 1888
Pasiphila
Moths of New Zealand
Endemic fauna of New Zealand
Taxa named by Edward Meyrick
Endemic moths of New Zealand